The Presbyterian University of East Africa (PUEA) is a chartered private university in Kenya. It is registered and accredited by the Commission for University Education (CUE). The University is located in Thogoto, Kikuyu in Kenya.

PUEA offers Certificate, Diploma, and Degree programmes in Computer Science, Theology, Business Administration, Education Health Sciences, Hotel and Tourism, Occupational Therapy, and Communication. It also offers two master's degrees: Master of Business Administration (MBA) and Master of Education in Educational Management.

References

Education in Central Province (Kenya)
Universities and colleges in Kenya
2007 establishments in Kenya